Phillip Forest Lewitski is a Canadian actor from Calgary, Alberta. He is most noted for his leading role as Apollo 4 in the television series Utopia Falls, and his performance as Lincoln in the 2021 film Wildhood, for which he received a Canadian Screen Award nomination for Best Actor at the 10th Canadian Screen Awards in 2022.

He is of mixed French Canadian, Ukrainian Canadian and Mohawk heritage.

He also had a recurring role in Vikings as We'jitu, and appears as Adam Whallach in the 2022 film Bones of Crows.

Filmography

Film

Television

References

External links

21st-century Canadian male actors
Canadian male film actors
Canadian male television actors
First Nations male actors
Male actors from Calgary
Living people
Year of birth missing (living people)
Franco-Albertan people
Canadian people of Ukrainian descent
Canadian people of Mohawk descent